Nippering is a locality in the Wheatbelt region of Western Australia within the Shire of Dumbleyung. The population of Nippering live within private farm house dwellings scattered within the locality's boundaries, living and working on farms managing live stock and producing a range of broadacre crops. At the 2021 census, Nippering had a population of 21.

Climate

References

External links
 History of Nippering
 Shire of Dumbleyung

Towns in Western Australia
Wheatbelt (Western Australia)